Hope is a mini-album by Australian singer-songwriter Meg Mac, released on 7 June 2019.

Reception

Daniel Hanssen from The AU Review said "Hope is a record for Meg Mac to be proud of. It emphasises the heavier parts of life, whilst still paying homage to those lighter moments. These shade of light and dark are combined with such grace and clarity that it's hard not to be caught up in the experience... [it] shows why listeners have long been able to connect with Meg Mac's music."

Jeff Jenkins from JB Hi-Fi said "Meg Mac doesn’t exactly sound like Adele, but it's a valid comparison, because her voice is capable of soaring even when she's in pain" adding "[she] deserves to top the charts".

Track listing
 "Give Me My Name Back" – 3:11
 "Something Tells Me" – 3:36
 "Hope" – 4:35
 "Head Away" – 3:56
 "I'm Not Coming Back" – 3:06
 "Want Me to Stay" – 3:29
 "Before Trouble" – 5:31

Charts

Release history

References

2019 albums
Meg Mac albums
EMI Records albums